RSC may refer to:

Arts
 Royal Shakespeare Company, a British theatre company
 Reduced Shakespeare Company, a touring American acting troupe
 Richmondshire Subscription Concerts, a music society in Richmond, North Yorkshire, England
 Rock Steady Crew, a breakdancing crew and hip hop group from The Bronx, New York City

Science and technology
 Chromatin structure remodeling (RSC) complex, a 17-subunit complex with the capacity to remodel the structure of chromatin
 Reconfigurable Supercomputing, a method of supercomputing that takes advantage of reconfigurable computing architectures (such as FPGAs)
 Recursive Systematic Convolutional code, a type of convolutional code
 Reed–Solomon code, a non-binary cyclic error-correcting code
 Regular Slotted Container, a common form of corrugated fiberboard box
 Reverse Standards Conversion, a video standards conversion process
 RISC Single Chip, the single chip version of the POWER1 processor
 Ribeyrolles, Sutter and Chauchat, joint designers of an early semi-automatic rifle often referred to as the RSC M1917 or simply RSC
 Regional Security Coordinator, concerning electricity network stability

Places and institutions
 Railway Safety Commission, a government agency of the Republic of Ireland
 Religious Sisters of Charity, a Roman Catholic religious order for women
 Religious Studies Center, the research arm of Religious Education at Brigham Young University
 Republican Study Committee, a conservative caucus of the U.S. House of Representatives
 Richard Stockton College, former name of Stockton University, 1993–2015
 Robinsons Summit Center, Skyscraper in Makati, Metro Manila, Philippines
 Roosevelt Study Center, a research institute, conference center, and library on twentieth-century American history located in Middelburg, the Netherlands
 Royal Society of Canada, the senior national, bilingual body of distinguished Canadian scholars, humanists, scientists and artists
 Royal Society of Chemistry, a learned society in the United Kingdom
 Ryde Secondary College, a selective government high school in Sydney, Australia

Sports
 Red Sun Cycling Team, a Dutch women's elite cycling team
 Referee Stopped Contest, a result in amateur boxing if an opponent is outclassed, outscored or injured
 Regional Sports Centre, Waterford, Ireland 
 Rideau Sports Centre, Ottawa, Ontario, Canada
 River States Conference, an athletic conference affiliated with the National Association of Intercollegiate Athletics; formerly known as the Kentucky Intercollegiate Athletic Conference (KIAC)
 Roque Santa Cruz (born 1981), Paraguayan footballer

Law
 Rules of the Supreme Court, rules which governed civil procedure in England and Wales between 1883 and 1999
 Revised Statutes of Canada, the published and updated laws and ordinances of Canada

Other
 RSC Brands, automotive products company
 RailSimulator.com, a British video game developer and publisher, since renamed to Dovetail Games
 Reader service card, a reply card inserted in a magazine
 Recessed Single Contact bulb; see Lightbulb socket
 Regional Security Complex, a theory concerning international relations
 RuneScape Classic, a massively multiplayer online role-playing game developed and published by Jagex Games Studio
 Toyota RSC, a 2-door SUV concept car